The 2016 Italian F4 Championship Powered by Abarth was the third season of the Italian F4 Championship. It began on 9 April in Misano and finished on 30 October in Monza after seven triple header rounds.

Teams and drivers

Race calendar
The calendar was published on 23 November 2015.

Due to the large number of entries for the season, the race format was radically changed. Drivers were placed in three groups (A, B and C) depending on their qualifying placement. Each group contested two qualifying races, facing one of the other groups in each race. After the three qualifying races, the 36 (32 in Adria) drivers having scored the most points contested the final race. All four races were 25 minutes plus one lap in length and yield the same number of points.

After the number of entries declined from 41 to 31 for the second round, the series reverted to the classical three-race format used in 2015 from the third round onwards.

Championship standings

Points were awarded to the top 10 classified finishers in each race. No points were awarded for pole position or fastest lap. Only the best sixteen results were counted towards the championship. Race 3 of the first meeting at Imola Circuit was stopped after five laps, and half points were awarded.

Drivers' standings

Secondary Classes' standings

Teams' championship

Footnotes

References

External links

Italian F4 Championship section on the ACI Sport

Italian F4 Championship seasons
Italian
F4 Championship
Italian F4